Der Traummeister (The Dream Master) is a 1990 East German science fiction novel by Angela and Karlheinz Steinmüller. It is set in the same fictional universe as their 1982 novel Andymon and on the same planet as their earlier collection, Spera. Written in the last years of the GDR, The Dream Master offers a critique of centralizing, static utopias and, like other GDR literature of the seventies and eighties, thematizes the relationship between individual and collective, privileging the role of individual subjectivity. Critic Sonja Fritzsche has read the novel as a commentary on the situation in East Germany just before the fall of the Berlin wall.

References

1990 science fiction novels
German science fiction novels
East German novels
1990 German novels
Novels about dreams